Gilbert Flamank or Flamoke (c. 1508–1573), of Boscombe near Bodmin, Cornwall, was an English politician.

Ancestry
He was the son of the Bodmin MP John Flamank and Jane daughter of Sir Richard Nanfan, Deputy Lieutenant of Calais and Esquire of the King's Body and nephew of Thomas Flamank, co-leader of the Cornish Rebellion of 1497.

Career and Life
He was a Member of Parliament (MP) for Bodmin in 1529.

Family and descendants
Gilbert married Joan daughter of Reginald Gayer of Liskeard by Alice, daughter of Edward Courtenay of Landrake and had the following issue-

 7 sons
 2 daughters

References

Year of birth uncertain
1500s births
1573 deaths
Members of the Parliament of England for Bodmin
English MPs 1529–1536